Matti Jutila (born 17 September 1932) is a Canadian wrestler. He competed in two events at the 1964 Summer Olympics. He emigrated from Finland to Sudbury, Ontario in 1956.

References

External links
 

1932 births
Living people
Canadian male sport wrestlers
Canadian people of Finnish descent
Commonwealth Games medallists in wrestling
Commonwealth Games silver medallists for Canada
Finnish emigrants to Canada
Olympic wrestlers of Canada
Pan American Games medalists in wrestling
Pan American Games silver medalists for Canada
People from Nokia, Finland
Sportspeople from Greater Sudbury
Wrestlers at the 1964 Summer Olympics
Wrestlers at the 1962 British Empire and Commonwealth Games
Wrestlers at the 1963 Pan American Games
Medallists at the 1962 British Empire and Commonwealth Games